The 2021–22 FA Vase (Known for sponsorship reasons as the Buildbase FA Vase) was the 48th season of the FA Vase, an annual football competition for teams playing in Levels 9 and 10 (steps 5 & 6) of the English National League System. The competition is played with two qualifying rounds followed by six proper rounds, semi-finals, and the final played at Wembley Stadium. All ties this season were played to a finish on the day. For this season there were no replays in any of the rounds to minimise fixture congestion due to late start of the football season brought about by the COVID-19 pandemic. If games finished level after 90 minutes, the match was decided by penalties to find the winner of the tie, apart from the Final where there were 30 minutes extra time (15 minutes each way) followed by penalties if still level after the extra time period.

Calendar

First qualifying round
The draw was made on 9 July 2021.

Second qualifying round
The draw was also made on 9 July 2021.

First round proper
The draw was made on 27 September 2021.

Second round proper
The draw was made on 25 October 2021 featuring the 105 winners from the previous round with an additional 23 teams joining.

Third round proper
The draw was made on 22 November 2021.

Fourth round proper
The draw was made on 13 December 2021.

Fifth round proper
The draw was made on 17 January 2022.

Quarter-finals
The draw for the quarter-finals was made on 14 February 2022.

Semi-finals
The draw for the semi-finals was made on 14 March 2022.

Final

References

FA Vase seasons
Fa Vase